Káldy is a Hungarian surname. Notable people with the surname include:

György Káldy (1573–1634), Hungarian Jesuit and Bible translator
Zoltán Káldy (born 1969), Hungarian long-distance runner

Hungarian-language surnames